The Roman Catholic Diocese of Ganzhou/Kanchow is a diocese located in the city of Ganzhou (Jiangxi) in the Ecclesiastical province of Nanchang in China.

History
 August 25, 1920: Established as Apostolic Vicariate of Ganzhou 贛州 from the Apostolic Vicariate of Southern Kiangsi 江西南境
 April 11, 1946: Promoted as Diocese of Ganzhou 贛州

Leadership
 Bishops of Ganzhou 贛州 (Roman rite)
 Bishop John A. O'Shea, C.M. (April 11, 1946 – October 10, 1969)
 Vicars Apostolic of Ganzhou 贛州 (Roman Rite)
 Bishop John A. O'Shea, C.M. (July 3, 1931 – April 11, 1946)
 Bishop Paul-Marie Dumond, C.M. (May 12, 1925 – July 3, 1931)
 Bishop Paul-Marie Dumond, C.M. (Apostolic Administrator July 21, 1920 – May 12, 1925)

References

 GCatholic.org
 Catholic Hierarchy

Roman Catholic dioceses in China
Christian organizations established in 1920
Roman Catholic dioceses and prelatures established in the 20th century
Religion in Jiangxi
Ganzhou